Markus Samuli Lohi is a Finnish politician currently serving in the Parliament of Finland for the Centre Party at the Lapland constituency.

References

Living people
Members of the Parliament of Finland (2011–15)
Members of the Parliament of Finland (2015–19)
Members of the Parliament of Finland (2019–23)
Centre Party (Finland) politicians
21st-century Finnish politicians
Year of birth missing (living people)